Mont d'Arbois is a mountain of Haute-Savoie, France. It lies in the Beaufortain Massif range, at an altitude of  1833 metres above sea level.

History
The Mont d'Arbois is home to the Domaine du Mont d'Arbois, developed by Noémie de Rothschild in 1921. 

During World War II, French journalist Émile Servan-Schreiber hid here in his "Chalet Nanouk" with his Jewish family, including his Yiddish-speaking mother.

References

Mountains of the Alps
Mountains of Haute-Savoie